Boone County is a county in the U.S. state of Indiana. As of 2020, the population was 70,812. The county seat (and the county's only incorporated city) is Lebanon.

History
In 1787, the fledgling United States defined the Northwest Territory, which included the area of present-day Indiana. In 1800, Congress separated Ohio from the Northwest Territory, designating the rest of the land as the Indiana Territory. President Thomas Jefferson chose William Henry Harrison as the territory's first governor, and Vincennes was established as the territorial capital. After the Michigan Territory was separated and the Illinois Territory was formed, Indiana was reduced to its current size and geography. By December 1816 the Indiana Territory was admitted to the Union as a state.

Starting in 1794, Native American titles to Indiana lands were extinguished by usurpation, purchase, or war and treaty. The United States acquired land from the Native Americans in the 1809 treaty of Fort Wayne, and by the treaty of St. Mary's in 1818 considerably more territory became property of the government. This included the future Boone County, designating areas covered by the Delaware New Purchase.

Boone County was created by the state legislature on 1 April 1830, with Jamestown (which had been first settled that year) named as the initial county seat. The county was named for frontiersman Daniel Boone. The interim county commissioners met on 1 May of the following year to identify a permanent seat of government, which by law had to be within  of the county's center; the [future] city of Lebanon was selected to serve this purpose.

Geography
Boone County lies near the center of the state. It contains about 418.5 square miles (108,500 hectares), two-thirds of which is in cultivation. Its central position, excellent soil, and available water power have been in its favor.
The upper part of the county is drained by Sugar Creek, flowing westward into Montgomery County; the southwest part of the county is drained by Big Raccoon Creek, also flowing west-southwestward into Montgomery. The southeast part of the county is drained by Eagle Creek and its tributaries, flowing southward into Marion County.

Adjacent counties

 Clinton County − north
 Hamilton County − east
 Marion County − southeast
 Hendricks County − south
 Montgomery County − west

Cities
 Lebanon - county seat

Towns

 Advance
 Jamestown
 Thorntown
 Ulen
 Whitestown
 Zionsville

Unincorporated communities

 Big Springs
 Brendan Wood
 Dale
 Dover
 Eagle Village
 Eaglewood Estates
 Elizaville
 Fayette
 Fox Hollow
 Gadsden
 Hazel College
 Hazelrigg
 Herr
 Max
 Mechanicsburg
 Milledgeville
 New Brunswick
 Northfield
 Northfield Village
 Pike
 Rosston
 Royalton
 Russell Lake
 Shannondale (partial)
 Shepherd
 Stringtown
 Terhune
 The Woodlands
 Ward
 Waugh

Townships

Major highways

  Interstate 65
  Interstate 74
  Interstate 465
  Interstate 865
  U.S. Route 52
  U.S. Route 136
  U.S. Route 421
  Indiana State Road 32
  Indiana State Road 38
  Indiana State Road 39
  Indiana State Road 47
  Indiana State Road 75
  Indiana State Road 234
  Indiana State Road 267

Airport
 KTYQ - Indianapolis Executive Airport

Railroads
 CSX Transportation

Education
Public schools in Boone County are administered by the Lebanon Community School Corporation, Western Boone County Community School District, Zionsville Community Schools, and Sheridan Community Schools.

Climate and weather

Government

The county government is a constitutional body, and is granted specific powers by the Constitution of Indiana, and by the Indiana Code.

County Council: The legislative branch of the county's government; controls and revenue collection in the county. Representatives are elected to four-year terms from county districts. They set salaries, the annual budget, and special spending. The council has limited authority to impose local taxes, in the form of an income and property tax that is subject to state level approval, excise taxes, and service taxes.

Board of Commissioners: The executive body of the county; commissioners are elected county-wide to staggered four-year terms. One commissioner serves as president. The commissioners execute acts legislated by the council, collect revenue, and manage the county government.

Court: The county maintains a small claims court that handles civil cases. The judge on the court is elected to a term of four years and must be a member of the Indiana Bar Association. The judge is assisted by a constable who is also elected to a four-year term. In some cases, court decisions can be appealed to the state level circuit court.

County Officials: The county has other elected offices, including sheriff, coroner, auditor, treasurer, recorder, surveyor, and circuit court clerk. They are elected to four-year terms. Members elected to county government positions are required to declare a party affiliation and to be residents of the county.

Boone County is part of Indiana's 4th and 5th congressional districts, Indiana Senate districts 21 and 23, and Indiana House of Representatives districts 28, 38 and 87.

Prior to 1940, Boone County was a Democratic-leaning swing county in presidential elections, backing the national winner in every election from 1912 to 1936. From 1940 on, it has become a Republican stronghold, with no Democratic presidential candidate since Lyndon B. Johnson in 1964 even managing to win forty percent of the county's votes.

Demographics

2010 census
As of the 2010 United States Census, there were 56,640 people, 21,149 households, and 15,509 families in the county. The racial makeup of the county was 95.3% white, 1.7% Asian, 0.9% black or African American, 0.2% American Indian, 0.7% from other races, and 1.4% from two or more races. Those of Hispanic or Latino origin made up 2.2% of the population. In terms of ancestry, 28.9% were German, 19.3% were English, 14.1% were Irish, and 9.0% were American.

Of the 21,149 households, 38.8% had children under the age of 18 living with them, 61.1% were married couples living together, 8.4% had a female householder with no husband present, 26.7% were non-families, and 22.4% of all households were made up of individuals. The average household size was 2.65 and the average family size was 3.12. The median age was 38.6 years.

The median income for a household in the county was $47,697 and the median income for a family was $81,401. Males had a median income of $57,251 versus $41,309 for females. The per capita income for the county was $38,696. About 6.1% of families and 7.1% of the population were below the poverty line, including 8.6% of those under age 18 and 5.6% of those age 65 or over.

2020 census
As of the 2020 United States Census, there were 70,812 people.

See also
 List of public art in Boone County, Indiana
 National Register of Historic Places listings in Boone County, Indiana

References

Bibliography

External links

 Boone County Community Network
 Lebanon Community School Corporation
 Western Boone County Community School Dist
 Zionsville Community Schools
 Boone County Government

 
Indiana counties
1830 establishments in Indiana
Populated places established in 1830
Indianapolis metropolitan area